Carlie Andrea Mantilla (born May 05, 1989) is a Mexican-American actress and writer. She is best known for her work on Angel Falls Christmas, The Greatest Beer Run Ever, When Harry Tries to Marry, and Groundswell. She was named the Best Comedian in LA by the Los Angeles Magazine.

Biography 
Mantilla was born on May 05, 1989, in Los Angeles and raised between the United States and Mexico City. After completing her early education, she attended Los Angeles Film School.

Mantilla began her career performing stand-up comedy at the Hollywood Improv in Los Angeles. She later starred in the musical short Gangsta Waitress, which she co-wrote and which featured Lily Tomlin and Richard Lewis. She is the co-writer and director of the award winning digital series Your Mom Says Hi!. Mantilla wrote the 2021 movie Angel Falls Christmas, in which she played Angelina. The movie was aired on Amazon Prime and Netflix.

Mantilla won the NYC Winter Film Award of Excellence for Best digital series Your Mom Says Hi! in 2018, and was named Best Comedian in Los Angeles by Los Angeles Magazine.

Filmography

References

External links 
 

American actresses of Mexican descent
Living people
1989 births
21st-century American actresses
Actresses from Los Angeles
American television actresses